

352001–352100 

|-id=017
| 352017 Juvarra ||  || Filippo Juvarra (1678–1736) was an Italian architect in the late-Baroque, who designed the Basilica of Superga near Turin in 1731. || 
|}

352101–352200 

|-id=148
| 352148 Tarcisiozani || 2007 PH || Tarcisio Zani, an Italian designer of steel products and an amateur astronomer || 
|}

352201–352300 

|-id=214
| 352214 Szczecin ||  || The Polish town of Szczecin (Stettin), located on the river Odra in northwestern Poland, was the birth place of astrophysicist Aleksander Wolszczan. || 
|-id=273
| 352273 Turrell ||  || James Turrell (born 1943) an American artist, known for his work within the Light and Space movement. Turrell is working on Roden Crater, a volcanic cone located outside Flagstaff, Arizona, to be turned into a massive naked-eye observatory. || 
|}

352301–352400 

|-id=333
| 352333 Sylvievauclair ||  || Sylvie Vauclair (born 1946), a French astrophysicist at the Institut de Recherche en Astrophysique et Planétologie || 
|}

352401–352500 

|-bgcolor=#f2f2f2
| colspan=4 align=center | 
|}

352501–352600 

|-bgcolor=#f2f2f2
| colspan=4 align=center | 
|}

352601–352700 

|-id=646
| 352646 Blumbahs ||  || Fricis Blumbahs (1864–1949), a Latvian astronomer and meteorologist || 
|}

352701–352800 

|-id=760
| 352760 Tesorero ||  || Pico Tesorero, a prominent pyramidal peak located in the central massif of Picos de Europa in Spain || 
|}

352801–352900 

|-id=834
| 352834 Málaga ||  || Málaga is a city in southern Spain. It is an important cultural and cosmopolitan center in Andalusia. Málaga was founded by the Phoenicians in the 8th century BCE. || 
|-id=860
| 352860 Monflier ||  || Bruno Monflier (born 1947), an active promoter of scientific outreach in astronomy in France and abroad. || 
|}

352901–353000 

|-bgcolor=#f2f2f2
| colspan=4 align=center | 
|}

References 

352001-353000